Gigasperma is an inactive genus of fungi in the order Agaricales with a single species. It was treated either as the only genus in the monotypic family Gigaspermataceae, or part of the wider Cortinariaceae. Gigasperma was circumscribed by Austrian mycologist Egon Horak in 1971.

Taxonomy 
No species remain within this genus since Gigasperma cryptica was reclassified as Thaxterogaster crypticus in 2022.

Synonyms
 Gigasperma americanum Kropp & L.J. Hutchison, 1996 = Cryptolepiota americana (Kropp & L.J. Hutchison) Kropp & Trappe, 2012 
 Gigasperma clelandii (Rodway) E. Horak, 1971 = Horakiella clelandii (Rodway) Castellano & Trappe, 1992

See also
List of Agaricales families
List of Agaricales genera

References

External links
Gigasperma americanum at Species Fungorum
Gigasperma cryptica at Species Fungorum

Cortinariaceae
Agaricales genera
Taxa named by Egon Horak

fr:Gigaspermaceae (famille de champignons)